Yang Chin-hu (26 August 1898 – 12 July 1990) was a Taiwanese politician. He was the Mayor of Kaohsiung City from 1968–1973.

Political career
In 1947, Yang became a member of the National Assembly. He then later joined the China Democratic Socialist Party in 1948. In 1954, he ran for the Kaohsiung Mayoralty election and failed for four consecutive terms. However, he eventually won in 1968.

Personal life
On 12 June 1971, the 72-year-old Yang was engaged to the 47-year-old Chen Tsai-feng, his housekeeper. Initially, Yang's two adult daughters opposed the marriage. Eventually, his daughters and their husbands finally gave up and attended the engagement ceremony of their father. On 5 February 1984, the 86-year-old Yang married to the 61-year-old Chung Yu-yeh in a traditional church ceremony.

References

Mayors of Kaohsiung
1898 births
1990 deaths
China Democratic Socialist Party politicians